Mulcra is a locality in the Sunraysia region of Victoria (Australia). It is in the local government area of the Rural City of Mildura.

References

Towns in Victoria (Australia)